Leah Goldstein (born February 4, 1969 in Vancouver, British Columbia, Canada) is a professional Israeli road racing cyclist. In 2021, she became the first woman to win the overall solo division of the Race Across America (RAAM).

Early life 
Born in Canada, Goldstein was raised in Israel when her family made aliyah. At the age of 17 she won the Bantamweight World Kickboxing Championship. She spent 9 years in the Israeli commandos and secret police.

Career 
A natural athlete she won the 1989 World Bantamweight Kickboxing Championship, and was Israel's Duathlon champion. Shortly before the 2004 Olympics, she broke her hand in a race in Pennsylvania. And then in 2005, after winning 9 of her first 11 races she was involved in a horrific crash during the Cascade Classic that almost ended her career. She was hospitalized for two and a half months and told she would never walk without a cane.

In 2011, Goldstein won the women's solo category of Race Across America (RAAM). In 2019, she came in second in the women's division and fifth overall in RAAM. In June 2021, she won the overall solo division for this race in 11 days, three hours and three minutes.

Personal life 
Goldstein lives in Vernon, British Columbia.

Results

2000
3rd in National Championship, Road, ITT, Elite, Canada (F) (CAN)

2001
3rd in National Championship, Road, ITT, Elite, Canada (F) (CAN)

2002
2nd in Stage 1 Tour de Toona (F) (USA)
2nd in National Championship, Road, ITT, Elite, Canada (F) (CAN)

2003
3rd in Stage 1 Tour of the Gila (F) (USA)

2005
1st in Stage 2 Mount Hood Classic (F) (USA)
3rd in Stage 4 Mount Hood Classic (F) (USA)
1st in Stage 3 Mount Hood Classic (F) (USA)
1st in Stage 5 Mount Hood Classic (F) (USA)
1st in General Classification Mount Hood Classic (F) (USA)

2006
2nd in Stage 4 Mount Hood Classic (F) (USA)
3rd in Stage 6 Mount Hood Classic (F) (USA)
1st in General Classification Mount Hood Classic (F) (USA)

2007
1st in Stage 4 Mount Hood Classic (F) (USA)
2nd in Stage 5 Mount Hood Classic (F) (USA)
1st in General Classification Mount Hood Classic (F) (USA)
1st in National Championship, Road, ITT, Elite, Israel (F) (ISR)
1st in National Championship, Road, Elite, Israel (F) (ISR)
2nd in Tour de Gastown (F) (CAN)
2nd in Stage 3 Tour de Delta (F) (CAN)
2nd in General Classification Tour de Delta (F) (CAN)

2008
3rd in Stage 1 San Dimas Stage Race (F), Glendora (USA)
1st in Stage 1 Tour of the Gila (F), Mogollon R.R. (USA)
2nd in Stage 3 Tour of the Gila (F) (USA)
1st in General Classification Tour of the Gila (F) (USA)
1st in Stage 4 Mount Hood Classic (F) (USA)
3rd in General Classification Mount Hood Classic (F) (USA)
1st in National Championship, Road, ITT, Elite, Israel (F) (ISR)
1st in National Championship, Road, Elite, Israel (F) (ISR)

2009
1st in National Championship, Road, ITT, Elite, Israel (F) (ISR)

References

External links
Official Site

1969 births
Jewish Canadian sportspeople
Jewish Israeli sportspeople
Canadian female cyclists
Cyclists from British Columbia
Israeli female cyclists
Canadian emigrants to Israel
Canadian people of Israeli descent
Living people
Sportspeople from Vancouver